Isla Coronados, is an island in the Gulf of California east of the Baja California Peninsula in Baja California Sur state, Mexico. The island is uninhabited and is part of the Loreto Municipality.

Ecology

Reptilian life
Isla Coronados has 16 species of  reptiles, including Aspidoscelis hyperythrus (orange-throated whiptail), Aspidoscelis tigris (tiger whiptail), Callisaurus draconoides (zebra-tailed lizard), Coleonyx variegatus (western banded gecko), Coluber fuliginosus (Baja California coachwhip), Crotalus enyo (Baja California rattlesnake), Crotalus ruber (red diamond rattlesnake), Dipsosaurus dorsalis (desert iguana), Hypsiglena ochrorhyncha (coast night snake), Hypsiglena slevini (Baja California night snake), Phyllodactylus nocticolus (peninsular leaf-toed gecko), Sauromalus slevini (Slevin's chuckwalla), Sceloporus orcutti (granite spiny lizard), Sceloporus zosteromus (Baja California spiny lizard), Urosaurus nigricauda (black-tailed brush lizard), and Uta stansburiana (common side-blotched lizard).

References

Further reading
Steinbeck, John; Ricketts, Edward F. (1941). Sea of Cortez: A Leisurely Journal of Travel and Research, with a Scientific Appendix Comprising Materials for a Source Book on the Marine Animals of the Panamic Faunal Province. New York: Viking Press. 598 pp. (Reprinted by Paul P. Appel Publications, 1971). 

Islands of the Gulf of California
Islands of Baja California Sur
Loreto Municipality (Baja California Sur)
Nature reserves in Mexico
Protected areas of Baja California Sur
Uninhabited islands of Mexico